Groupe Artémis S.A. is a holding company with a portfolio of investments in fashion, wine, luxury, art, tourism, publishing, sports, food, and technology. Headquartered in Paris, France, Groupe Artémis was founded by François Pinault in 1992 as a family investment vehicle.

History
In 1992, the French entrepreneur François Pinault transferred his majority stake in Pinault-Printemps-Redoute (PPR, renamed Kering in 2013) to his new company, Groupe Artémis, created as a family investment vehicle. Throughout the 1990s, he engaged in a series of prestigious acquisitions.

The 1993 Château Latour acquisition was the first of a series under the Artémis Domaines label. Artémis acquired the winery René Engel (Vosne-Romanée, renamed Domaine d'Eugénie) in 2006, the Château Grillet (Condrieu AOC) in 2011, 1/10 of an acre of the Grand Cru Le Montrachet vineyard from Château de Puligny-Montrachet in 2012, the Napa Valley Araujo Estate Wines (Calistoga, renamed Eisele Vineyard) in 2013, and the Clos du Tart in 2017.

Groupe Artemis controls the auction house Christie's since 1998. Artémis bought the news magazine Le Point in 1997, the Stade Rennais F.C. in 1998,<ref>Adrian Vremera, [https://www.alux.com/richest-football-club-owners-in-europe/5/ 10 Richest Football Club Owners in Europe,  Alux.com, 2 July 2014]</ref> the History-focused publisher Tallandier in 1999, the luxury cruise operator Ponant in 2015 and the Brittany-Japan fusion Breizh Café. The group launched the tech-focused investment fund Red River West in 2017. Groupe Artémis is an important shareholder in the couture houses Giambattista Valli since 2017 and Courrèges since 2018, and in the magazine Point de Vue'' (royal family news) since 2018.

Groupe Artémis acquired the Palazzo Grassi in Venice in 2005, which reopened in 2006 as the first exhibition site of the Pinault Collection, and the Punta della Dogana, also in Venice, in 2009. Both buildings were renovated and remodeled by the Japanese architect Ando Tadao. In August 2016, the Mayor of Paris Anne Hidalgo and Groupe Artémis jointly announced the relaunch of Bourse de Commerce, located in Paris, into a Pinault Collection-branded contemporary art museum. The new museum contains 32,000 square feet of exhibition floor remodeled by Tadao Ando. Its opening is planned for Fall 2021.

Investments
Groupe Artémis invests in fashion, wine, luxury, art, tourism, publishing, sports, food, and technology. Groupe Artémis invests in the following companies:

See also
Kering
François Pinault
Pinault Collection

References

External links

Companies based in Paris
French companies established in 1992
Holding companies established in 1992
Pinault family
Holding companies of France